Aqraba is a Palestinian town in the Nablus Governorate, located eighteen kilometers southeast of Nablus in the northern West Bank. According to the Palestinian Central Bureau of Statistics (PCBS), Aqraba had a population of approximately 8,180 inhabitants in 2007.

According to Applied Research Institute–Jerusalem since 1967, Israel has confiscated 1,425 dunums of Aqraba and Yanun's land for use for settlements, Israeli Military bases and for the Wall Zone. According to Kerem Navot, 3,265 dunams of mostly cultivated land were seized per military order T12/72 and transferred to the settlement of Gittit.
Nearby hamlets surround the village and are considered to be natural extensions of Aqraba; they are the khirbets of al-Arama, al-Kroom, Abu ar-Reisa, ar-Rujman, Firas ad-Din and Tell al-Khashaba. The total population of these hamlets was estimated to be 500 in 2008. The prominent families of Aqraba are Al Dayriyeh, Bani Jaber, Al-Mayadima, Bani Jame', and Bani Fadel.

Aqrabah has been the site of price tag attacks by Israeli settlers.

Etymology
The origin of the name is Semitic - Canaanite or Aramaic. In Arabic 'aqraba' means "scorpion".

History and archaeology
Pottery sherds from Iron Age II, Hellenistic, Roman, Byzantine, Umayyad and Crusader/Ayyubid period, as well as rock-hewn cisterns have been found in Aqraba. In 1874 surveyors found near the village rock-cut kokhim tombs.

During the Second Temple period it was an important town (see Mishna, Ma'aser Sheni 5:2), named by Josephus (37–c. 100) as Akrabbatá, the capital of a district called Akrabbatène (Wars 3:3, 5). Eusebius calls the town 'Akrabbeim and the district Akrabbatinés. Safrai suggested that the Bar Kokhba revolt devastated Akrabbatène's Jewish population, and Samaritans thereafter assumed control of the area.

Byzantine period
Aqraba was inhabited by Christians during the Byzantine period. A Syriac document notes that the village contained two Byzantine-era monasteries, called after saints Titus and Stephan. Local tradition concurs with a number of British scholars who believe the mosque was originally a Byzantine-era church.

Early Muslim period
The inhabitants of Aqraba became Muslim during the early Muslim period (630s–1099). Shihab al-Din Ahmad al-Aqrabani, a follower of the noted Muslim jurist al-Shafi'i, lived and was buried there in 180 AH/796–797 CE.

Crusader/Ayyubid to Mamuk period
Several medieval buildings and other remains were described in the 1930s and 1940s and revisited in the 1990s, such as a fortified courtyard building northwest of the mosque, known as al-Hisn ("the castle") dominating the village from its highest point and now part of a private building; an open cistern or pool (Arabic:birka) in the centre of the village, well preserved but now used as an orchard; and a domed building said to be Mamluk, probably a mosque which is in use as the village school The mosque's mihrab was flanked by marble columns topped by capitals, both from the Crusader period.

The village mosque is built on the remains of a church, and in the Survey of Western Palestine the Greek inscriptions found there on a lintel decorated by a cross, are described as similar to Crusader-period ones.

Pottery sherds from the Mamluk era and a construction inscription in Arabic from 1414 have been found in the village.

Ottoman period
Aqraba, like the rest of Palestine, was incorporated into the Ottoman Empire in 1517, and in the census of 1596 the village appeared under the name Aqraba as being in the Nahiya (Subdistrict) of Jabal Qubal, part of  Sanjak Nablus, with a population of 102 households, all Muslim. They paid a fixed tax-rate of 33.3% on agricultural products, including wheat, barley, summer crops, olive trees, goats and bee-hives; vineyards and fruit trees, in addition to occasional revenues, and a press for olive oil or grape syrup; a total of 3,960 akçe.

During his travels in the region in 1838 Edward Robinson mentions it, believing it was ancient Acrabi.
Victor Guérin visited in 1870, and described as a large town with 2000 inhabitants. He further noted that it consisted of four quarters, each with their own sheikh.

In 1873-4 Clermont-Ganneau visited, and was told of the governor el Kadery, who resided in Aqraba at the time of Jezzar Pasha. He is said to have erected considerable buildings in the town.

In 1882, the PEF's Survey of Western Palestine described it as "A large village, surrounded with olives, of houses better built than most in the country. It stands on a saddle between two hills, one of which rises north of it 700 feet, the village standing at the mouth of a pass, through which the main road runs. The place crescent-shaped, whence perhaps its name, ' carved.' To the south is the fertile plain (Jehir 'Akrabeh). There is a mosque in the east part of the village, founded on the remains of a Christian church, and a second sacred place (er Rafai) on the south. The inhabitants used to number, according to their own account, 2,000 guns, but the present population appears to be about 600 to 800 souls."

British Mandate period
In the 1922 census of Palestine conducted by the British Mandate authorities, Aqraba had a population of 1,160; 1,158 Muslims and 2 Orthodox Christians, increasing in the 1931 census, where Aqraba (together with the smaller location Kh. Fasayil) had a population of 1,478, all Muslims, in a total of 309 houses.

In the 1945 statistics Aqraba (including Kh. Fasayil) had a population of 2,060, all Muslims, with 142,530 dunams of land, according to an official land and population survey. Of this, 3,383 dunams were plantations and irrigable land, 19,732 used for cereals, while 55 dunams were built-up (urban) land.

Jordanian period
In the wake of the 1948 Arab–Israeli War, following the 1949 Armistice Agreements, Aqraba was ruled by Jordan.
In 1961, the population of Aqraba was 2,875.

Israeli occupation 
Since the Six-Day War in 1967, Aqraba has been under Israeli occupation.

According to Applied Research Institute–Jerusalem Israel has confiscated 1,085 dunums of land from  Aqraba/Yanun for Gitit and Itamar (where the land for Gitit was taken from Aqraba, while the land for Itamar was taken from Yanun.)

Some farmland near Yanun owned by 300 Aqraba villagers was classified as an IDF firing range in 1967, but exercises were customarily suspended for brief periods in the past to allow the villagers access to their lands, according to local Palestinians. Since then they claim, the area has not been used in as a firing range for two decades. Recently these villagers, who either farm or live there have been denied access. They claim that this restriction does not apply equally to an outpost, Givat 777, of the Israeli settlement of Itamar. They complain of settler harassment, the burning of vehicles, and of settler sheep flocks being led to graze on their wheat fields. The IDF has replied that both Palestinians and Israeli settlers are treated in the same way.

In August 2014, the IDF brought in bulldozers to demolish 4 Palestinian homes on the outskirts of the town, in the al-Taweel neighbourhood, claiming that they were built without a permit. However, the villagers claimed that the houses had been there for a century.

In October 2014, a village mosque was set alight in an suspected arson attack by Israeli settlers as part of the price tag attack. A similar arson attack took place in April 2018, with settlers also spraying graffiti on the mosque walls.

Economy
The village's total land area is 34,700 dunams, of which 1,783 is built-up area. Around 62% of the remaining land is covered with olive and almond groves, 8% with other fruits and vegetables and the remaining 30% for grazing purposes.

Aqraba's unemployment rate is above 50%. As the Palestinian labor force is unable to work in Israeli localities, the town's workers currently hold public and private jobs. Some also depend on agriculture and industrial workshops as main sources of income.

Government
31% of Aqraba and Yanun land are located in Area B, giving the Palestinian National Authority control over its administration and civil affairs. The rest, 69%, is in Area C.

The town is governed by a municipal council, consisting of eleven members including the mayor. In the 2005 Palestinian municipal elections, the Fatah-backed Future Palestine list won the majority of the seats (six) while the Hamas-backed al-Islamiya list won five seats. Jawdat 'Abd al-Hadi was elected mayor.

References

Bibliography

 
 
 
 (pp.  228, 266-7) 

 
 
 

 (p. 159)

External links
Aqraba municipality
Welcome To 'Aqraba
 Aqraba, Welcome to Palestine
Survey of Western Palestine, Map 15:  IAA, Wikimedia commons
Aqraba Town Profile (including Yanun Locality), Applied Research Institute–Jerusalem (ARIJ)
 Aqraba, aerial photo, ARIJ
 March 2009 demolition orders for Aqraba homes and mosque

Towns in the West Bank
Municipalities of the State of Palestine
Ancient Samaritan settlements